The Kinnelon Public Schools is a comprehensive community public school district that serves students in pre-kindergarten through twelfth grade from Kinnelon, in Morris County, New Jersey, United States.

As of the 2020–21 school year, the district, comprised of four schools, had an enrollment of 1,670 students and 165.0 classroom teachers (on an FTE basis), for a student–teacher ratio of 10.1:1.

The district is classified by the New Jersey Department of Education as being in District Factor Group "I", the second-highest of eight groupings. District Factor Groups organize districts statewide to allow comparison by common socioeconomic characteristics of the local districts. From lowest socioeconomic status to highest, the categories are A, B, CD, DE, FG, GH, I and J.

Schools
Schools in the district (with 2020–21 enrollment data from the National Center for Education Statistics) are:
Elementary schools
Kiel Elementary School with 312 students in grades PreK-2
Jennifer Oluwole, Principal
Stonybrook Elementary School with 346 students in grades 3-5
Dawn Uttel, Principal
Middle schools
Pearl R. Miller Middle School with 427 students in grades 6-8
Mark P. Mongon, Principal
High school
Kinnelon High School with 570 students in grades 9-12
Gary T. Suda, Principal

Administration
Core members of the district's administration are:
Diane DiGiuseppe, Superintendent
Kerry A. Keane, Business Administrator / Board Secretary

Board of education
The district's board of education, comprised of nine members, sets policy and oversees the fiscal and educational operation of the district through its administration. As a Type II school district, the board's trustees are elected directly by voters to serve three-year terms of office on a staggered basis, with three seats up for election each year held (since 2012) as part of the November general election. The board appoints a superintendent to oversee the district's day-to-day operations and a business administrator to supervise the business functions of the district.

References

External links
Kinnelon Public Schools

School Data for the Kinnelon Public Schools, National Center for Education Statistics

Kinnelon, New Jersey
New Jersey District Factor Group I
School districts in Morris County, New Jersey